Nee! is a 1965 Indian Tamil-language film, directed by Kanagashanmugam (with T. R. Ramanna receiving "supervising director" credit) and produced by T. K. Ramaraj. The film stars Jaishankar and Jayalalithaa. It was released on 21 August 1965 and became a commercial success.

Plot 

Sundaram, a rich man, falls in love with an orphaned girl, and marries her over the objections of his elder brother. He sets up a home of his own with his wife, but when his family members persuade him to rejoin the household, he brings his wife to his brother's house. There is once again cheer and sunshine in his life. Trouble arises when he is away from the house to accept a new job offered to him. The son-in-law of the house, a magistrate, leaks out the news that the orphan girl has earlier been convicted by him for immoral traffic. At once, insults are heaped on her. Unable to bear the taunting remarks, the girl leaves the house and attempts. The real drama then begins and all ends well.

Cast 
Jaishankar as Sundaram
Jayalalithaa as Jaya and Usha
 Nagesh as Raju
 S. V. Sahasranamam as Ramadurai
 Pandari Bai as Mangalam
 S. V. Ramadoss as Gopal
G. Sakunthala as Chithra
 Madhavi as Chellayee
 R. S. Manohar as Sekar
 Ennatha Kannaiya
Karikol Raju as Saamy
 Sadhan as Chappan
 M. Bhanumathi as Sundaram's fiancé
 Shoba as Sundaram's sister in law.

Production 
Nee! was directed by Kanagashanmugam, while T. R. Ramanna received "supervising director" credit. The film was produced by T. K. Ramaraj under Sri Vinayaga Pictures, and was the company's first production. Sakthi T. K. Krishnasamy was the writer, Selvaraj was art director, M. A. Rahiman was cinematographer, and M. S. Money was editor. The film was completed in two months, and its final cut measured .

Soundtrack 
The music was composed by M. S. Viswanathan, while the lyrics were written by Vaali.

Release and reception 

Nee! was released on 21 August 1965. Writing for Sport and Pastime, T. M. Ramachandran positively reviewed the film, saying the male and female leads showed "promising talent". The film became a commercial success.

References

External links 
 

1960s Tamil-language films
1966 films
Films directed by T. R. Ramanna
Films scored by M. S. Viswanathan
Indian black-and-white films